Hua Giam Si, is a Buddhist monastery in Singapore. The center was originally set up by Venerable Zhen Ding. The present premises are located at Geylang, Singapore.

Overview
Hua Giam Si was founded in 2000 by Venerable Zhen Ding. The temple is inspired by the Huayan school of Chinese Buddhism and the Koyasan Shingon tradition of Japanese Buddhism. It enshrines statues of:

 Mahavairocana
 Mahamayuri
 Guanyin
 Bhaisajyaguru
 The Twelve Heavenly Generals
 Ksitigarbha
 Sūryaprabha
 Candraprabha

See also
Buddhism in Singapore

References

External links

Buddhist organisations based in Singapore
Buddhist temples in Singapore
Chinese-Singaporean culture
Shingon Buddhism
Geylang